The Pro-Specs Cup 1997 was the eighth competition of the Korean League Cup, and one of two Korean League Cups held in 1997.

Group stage

Group A

Group B

Knockout stage

Bracket

Semi-finals

Final

Busan Daewoo Royals won 3–1 on aggregate.

Awards

Source:

See also
1997 in South Korean football
1997 Korean League Cup
1997 K League
1997 Korean FA Cup

References

External links
RSSSF

1997 Supplementary
1997 domestic association football cups
1997 in South Korean football